The 2007 UEFA Super Cup was the 32nd UEFA Super Cup, an annual football match between the winners of the previous season's UEFA Champions League and UEFA Cup competitions. The match was held at the Stade Louis II in Monaco on 31 August 2007 and contested by Milan, who won the 2006–07 UEFA Champions League, and Sevilla, winners of the 2006–07 UEFA Cup. Sevilla were looking to become only the second team to defend the trophy in its history, the first being Milan, who had previously won the trophy four times. This was Milan's seventh appearance in the Super Cup, putting them one ahead of the previous season's runners-up, Barcelona.

The death of Sevilla midfielder Antonio Puerta raised a possibility that the match would be cancelled, but the game was still played, and all players wore the name "PUERTA" on their shirt, below their number.

Milan won the match 3–1, with goals from Filippo Inzaghi, Marek Jankulovski and the UEFA Club Footballer of the Year, Kaká. All three of Milan's goals came in the second half after Renato had put Sevilla 1–0 up after only 14 minutes. This was Milan's fifth Super Cup title, a new record.

Match

Summary
Sevilla had an opportunity to open the scoring early on, when Renato pounced on Massimo Oddo's fluffed clearance, but he sent his shot wide. Two minutes later, Milan had a chance to score after Filippo Inzaghi's shot was deflected onto the post by Kaká. Sevilla went 1–0 up on 14 minutes when Renato headed in from Duda's corner. The Sevilla players celebrated the goal by pointing towards the sky. Sevilla almost scored a second goal on 25 minutes, after Gennaro Gattuso's attempt to intercept a Sevilla counter only resulted in him sliding the ball to Frédéric Kanouté, who rounded Dida but played his pass behind Renato. The Brazilian was able to get the ball under control and get a shot off, but saw his shot blocked by Alessandro Nesta. However, Inzaghi tied the score after the break after scoring a free header from Gennaro Gattuso's cross from the right side. Marek Jankulovski found the winner soon afterwards through a lovely left-footed volley to hit a low diagonal shot to the keeper's left. Kaká capped off the fine overall display when he headed home the rebound after his initial shot from a penalty was saved.

Details

Statistics

See also
2006–07 UEFA Champions League
2006–07 UEFA Cup
A.C. Milan in European football
Sevilla FC in European football

References

External links
2007 UEFA Super Cup at UEFA.com

Super Cup
UEFA Super Cup
Super Cup 2007
UEFA Super Cup
Super Cup 2007
International club association football competitions hosted by Monaco
August 2007 sports events in Europe